Pia Eleonore Rumler-Detzel (born 11 July 1934) is a German lawyer. In 1988, she became a member of the Federal Party of the CDU. In December 2004, she was elected as the first woman chair. She was the chairman of the medical confiscation senate at the Higher Regional Court of Cologne until her retirement.

References

German women lawyers
20th-century German lawyers
20th-century German women
1934 births
Living people
20th-century women lawyers